Howard Presents is a Canadian children's television series which aired on CBC Television in 1978.

Premise
This series reunited Razzle Dazzle stars Michele Finney and puppet Howard the Turtle. Episodes featured serials such as Trail Of The Royal Mounted, news items and old films.

Scheduling
This half-hour series was broadcast on weekdays at 4:00 p.m. (Eastern) from 28 August to 8 September 1978.

References

External links
 

CBC Television original programming
1978 Canadian television series debuts
1978 Canadian television series endings